George James Terwilliger III (born June 5, 1950) is an American lawyer and public official.  He is a partner in the Washington, D.C. office of McGuireWoods LLP where he is head of the firm's Crisis Response practice and co-head of its white collar team. He is a former United States Deputy Attorney General and acting United States Attorney General. Terwilliger, of Vermont, was nominated on February 14, 1992, by President George H. W. Bush to be Deputy Attorney General at the U.S. Department of Justice. He succeeded William Pelham Barr. As Deputy Attorney General, Terwilliger became the second-highest-ranking official in the United States Department of Justice (DOJ) and ran the day-to-day operations of the department, serving in that position from 1991 through 1993. He was appointed to the position by President George H.W. Bush after serving as the United States Attorney for the District of Vermont, appointed by President Reagan.

Early and family life

Terwilliger was born June 5, 1950, in New Brunswick, New Jersey. He grew up in Metuchen, N.J., went to public school, graduated from Seton Hall University (B.A., 1973) with a degree in Communications and Antioch School of Law (J.D., 1978). Married, Terwilliger has three children and three grandchildren, and resides in Alexandria and Delaplane, Virginia. His father, George J. Terwilliger, Jr., was a civil engineer and Navy veteran with combat experience in the Pacific in World War II. His mother, Ruth Terwilliger, was a librarian and worked in real estate sales.

Career

Early government service
After admission to the bar, from 1978 to 1981, Terwilliger served as Assistant U.S. Attorney for the District of Columbia (1978–81) and an Assistant U.S. Attorney for the District of Vermont (1981–86) and then became U.S. Attorney for Vermont (1986-1990) and later Deputy U.S. Attorney General (1991–93) in the George H. W. Bush administration. Terwilliger specialized in white-collar crime and terrorism. In 1993, Terwilliger "briefly took the helm of the Justice Department as acting attorney general after the departure of former Attorney General William P. Barr."

Iran-Contra
Terwilliger commented on the Iran–Contra affair in a February 6, 2001 appearance on a CNN titled "Burden of Proof: Ronald Reagan's Legal Legacy".

2000 Florida recount
During the Florida 2000 election recount, Terwilliger was co-leader of Republican President-elect George W. Bush's legal team and was "an advisor to the Bush-Cheney Transition and counselor to designated cabinet and other prospective appointees."

In June 2001, Bush administration spokesman Ari Fleischer was asked in a White House press briefing whether Terwilliger was a leading candidate to head the Federal Bureau of Investigation.

Private legal practice

Rather than return to government service, in 2003, Terwilliger co-founded the 527 committee "Americans for a Better Country" with Frank J. Donatelli, former Ronald Reagan White House political director and secretary and treasurer of the Young America's Foundation, and Craig Shirley, president and CEO of Shirley & Banister Public Affairs.

In April 2007 Terwilliger served as a panelist for the Brookings Institution Judicial Issues Forum entitled "Politics and the Justice Department: Finding a Path to Accountability". Attorney General Alberto R. Gonzales resigned August 27, 2007, and left office on September 17, 2007. On October 10, 2007, news outlets reported that Gonzales hired Terwilliger "to represent him in investigations of mismanagement" of the U.S. Department of Justice. "Investigators are look[ing] into allegations that Gonzales lied to lawmakers and illegally allowed politics to influence hiring and firing at the department." Terwilliger represented Gonzales through several Inspector General investigations and a subsequent criminal investigation by a special prosecutor. Gonzales was exonerated in all matters.

In 2008, the American Bar Association mentioned Terwilliger as a leading candidate for Attorney General under a John McCain presidency. It related that while in the USDOJ during the Reagan Administration, Terwilliger dealt with resolving matters such as investigating BCCI after an international banking scandal and investigating after the savings and loan scandal, environmental cases, antitrust merger reviews and enforcement matters, civil rights and voting cases as well as terrorism and national security cases. Terwilliger was also in charge of all Justice Department operations, including crisis response, such as the 1992 Los Angeles riots. On policy matters, he was a principal in the highest councils of government charged with addressing the broad array of legal policy issues arising in the executive branch.

Current high profile work
Terwilliger currently represents former U.S. Congressman Aaron Schock, indicted in 2016 after resigning from his legislative position. In March 2017, Terwilliger and his colleagues publicized the involvement of a former Schock staffer who acted as a confidential informant in the case after the indictment.

He also represents Mark Meadows, former White House Chief of Staff to President Donald Trump, with regard to the investigation of the January 6 attack on the U.S. Capitol by a Select Committee of the U.S. House of Representatives.

Affiliations
Counsel, National Gambling Impact Study Commission (1997)
Legal Advisory Council, National Legal Center for the Public Interest
Washington Legal Foundation
American Bar Association

References

External links
George Lardner Jr. and Peter Slevin, "Military May Try Terrorism Cases. Bush Cites 'Emergency'," Washington Post (Freedom of Information Center), November 14, 2001.
"Terror Tribunals," PBS Online NewsHour, November 14, 2001: "Gwen Ifill examines the debate over trying terrorists in military rather than civilian courts with George Terwilliger, former deputy attorney general for the first Bush administration, and Laura Murphy, director of the Washington office of the American Civil Liberties Union."
Dan Eggen, "Reid Says Senators Would Block Olson. Choice for Attorney General Awaited," Washington Post, September 13, 2007.
Michael Isikoff and Mark Hosenball, "Gonzales Hires a Top Gun. Still under investigation by Congress and Justice Department lawyers who once worked for him, the former attorney general has turned to a leading Washington attorney to help him beat the rap," Newsweek/MSNBC, October 10, 2007.

|-
 

1950 births
David A. Clarke School of Law alumni
Lawyers from Washington, D.C.
Living people
McGuireWoods people
Seton Hall University alumni
United States Attorneys for the District of Vermont
United States Deputy Attorneys General
20th-century American lawyers
21st-century American lawyers